Cristian Borja is the name of:

Cristian Martínez Borja (born 1988), Colombian football forward 
Cristian Borja (footballer, born 1993), Colombian football defender